Rocco Reitz (born 29 May 2002) is a German professional footballer who plays as a midfielder for Belgian club Sint-Truiden on loan from the Bundesliga club Borussia Mönchengladbach.

Career
Reitz made his professional debut for Borussia Mönchengladbach in the Bundesliga on 24 October 2020, starting in the away match against Mainz 05 before being substituted out in the 60th minute for Jonas Hofmann.

On 17 January 2023, Reitz returned to Sint-Truiden in Belgium for a second loan, until the end of the 2022–23 season.

References

External links
 
 
 
 

2002 births
Footballers from Duisburg
Living people
German footballers
Germany youth international footballers
Association football midfielders
Borussia Mönchengladbach players
Sint-Truidense V.V. players
Bundesliga players
Regionalliga players
Belgian Pro League players
German expatriate footballers
Expatriate footballers in Belgium
German expatriate sportspeople in Belgium